Press the Eject and Give Me the Tape is a live album by the British gothic rock band Bauhaus, released in 1982 on Beggars Banquet Records, and recorded in London and Liverpool in 1981 and 1982.

Content 
The album cover is a photograph by Eugene Merinov.

Release 
The album was originally a bonus disc with the initial limited edition of the 1982 studio album The Sky's Gone Out. Later in the year it was released as a separate album, with initial copies receiving a free single and poster pack. The "Satori in Paris" single features live versions of "Double Dare" and "Hair of the Dog" not recorded at the same gigs from the album, the poster being a montage of the band's history on stage and beyond.

The album was reissued in 1988 with six bonus tracks, including the previously unissued "Of Lillies and Remains" and a cover of the Velvet Underground's "Waiting for the Man" recorded live at Fagins, Manchester, 22 October 1981, featuring Nico on vocals (this track was also a track on the "Ziggy Stardust" single). The version of "Terror Couple Kill Colonel" had previously been released on the b-side of the "Spirit" 7" single.

Track listing

"Satori in Paris" 
The "Satori in Paris" single was a free insert in the first UK press release of the Press the Eject and Give Me the Tape LP, and on the New Rose label in France. Both tracks are live versions recorded at Le Rose Bon Bon, Paris, France on 3 December 1981. Both tracks are included as bonus tracks on CD reissues of the LP.

Track listing
"Double Dare"
"Hair of the Dog"

References

External links 

 

Bauhaus (band) albums
1982 live albums
Beggars Banquet Records live albums